Rama Ayalon is an Israeli French-to-Hebrew translator. She has translated over 80 works of classic and contemporary literature. Among her translations are important philosophical works such as Pensées by Blaise Pascal and Totalité et infini by Emmanuel Lévinas. Among the authors she has translated are Michel Houellebecq, Georges Simenon, Marguerite Duras, Guy de Maupassant, Romain Gary, Milan Kundera, Delphine de Vigan, and Leïla Slimani.

In 2016, she received Israel's Minister of Culture Translation prize.

In 2022 she was awarded Chevalier dans L’ordre des arts et des lettres by the French Minister of Culture.

Translations 
 Marie Curie et ses filles, by Claudine Monteil — 2023
 Vernon Subutex, 1, by Virginie Despentes — 2023
 Auschwitz et après, by Charlotte Delbo — 2023
 Tous les hommes n'habitent pas le monde de la même façon, by Jean-Paul Dubois — 2023
 Les Gratitudes, by Delphine de Vigan — 2022
 Ce que le jour doit à la nuit, by Yasmina Khadra - 2022
 Rien n'est noir, by Claire Berest — 2022
 L'anomalie, by Hervé Le Tellier — 2022
 La Cheffe, roman d'une cuisinière, by Marie Ndiaye — 2021
 La Vraie Vie, by Adeline Dieudonné — 2021
 Semmelweis , by Louis-Ferdinand Céline — 2021
 La Dame à la louve, by Renée Vivien — 2021
 Le consentement, by Vanessa Springora — 2020
 Maigret à New York, by Georges Simenon — 2020
 La mise à nu, by Jean-Philippe Blondel — 2020
 Histoire de la violence, by Édouard Louis — 2020
 Désorientale, by Négar Djavadi — 2020
 L'invenzione occasionale, by Elena Ferrante — 2020 (from Italian)
 L'Affaire Saint-Fiacre, by Georges Simenon — 2020
 La Disparition de Stephanie Mailer, by Joël Dicker — 2019
 D'après une histoire vraie, by Delphine de Vigan — 2019
 l'itinéraire de pensée d'Emmanuel Levinas, by Georges Hansel — 2019
 The Word Collector, by Peter H. Reynolds — 2019 (from English)
 L'ordre du jour, by Eric Vuillard — 2018
 Danser au bord de l’abîme, by Grégoire Delacourt — 2018
 En finir avec Eddy Bellegueule, by Édouard Louis — 2018
 Le chemin de la montagne, by Marianne Dubuc — 2018
 Rien ne s'oppose à la nuit, by Delphine de Vigan — 2018
 Dans le Jardin de l'Ogre, by Leïla Slimani — 2018
 L'Amie de Madame Maigret, by Georges Simenon — 2018
 La Nuit du carrefour, by Georges Simenon — 2018
 Réparer les vivants, by Maylis de Kerangal — 2018
 Le Livre des Baltimore, by Joël Dicker — 2017
 Cécile est morte, by Georges Simenon — 2017
 Chanson douce, by Leïla Slimani — 2017
 6h41, by Jean-Philippe Blondel — 2017
 Alors vous ne serez plus jamais triste, by Baptiste Beaulieu — 2017
 Maigret et son mort, by Georges Simenon — 2017
 Jacob, Jacob, by Valérie Zenatti — 2017
 L'Horloger d'Everton & Les fantômes du chapelier, by Georges Simenon — 2016
 Pensées, by Blaise Pascal — 2016
 L'Inutile Beauté, recueil de nouvelles, by Guy de Maupassant — 2016
 Maigret tend un piège, by Georges Simenon — 2016
 L'amour sans le faire, by Pierre Joncours — 2016
 Ennemies publics, by Michel Houellebecq and Bernard-Henri Lévy — 2016
 La fête de l'insignifiance, by Milan Kundera — 2015 
 Monsieur Gallet, décédé, by Georges Simenon — 2015
 La femme au carnet rouge, by Antoine Laurent — 2015
 Alors Voilà, Les 1001 vies des urgences, by Baptiste Beaulieu — 2015 
 Pseudo, by Romain Gary — 2015
 Tête d'un homme, by Georges Simenon — 2015
 Alex (Albin Michel), by Pierre Lemaitre — 2015
 Moderato cantabile, by Marguerite Duras — 2015
 Monsieur le Commandant, by Romain Slocombe 2015 
 Histoire de la Merde, by Dominique Laporte — 2015
 Piettr-le-Letton, by Georges Simenon — 2014
 Pierre et Jean, by Guy de Maupassant — 2014
 Le Sermon sur la Chute de Rome, by Jérôme Ferrari — 2014
 La Verite sur l'affaire Harry Quebert, by Joël Dicker — 2014
 De Dieu qui vient à l'idée, by Emmanuel Lévinas — 2013
 L'Amant, by Marguerite Duras — 2013 
 La Sorcière, by Marie Ndiaye — 2012
 Ce que je sais de Vera Candida, by Véronique Ovaldé — 2012
 No et moi, by Delphine de Vigan — 2012
 HHhH, by Laurent Binet — 2012 
 Grand loup & petit loup, by Nadine Brun-Cosme and Olivier Tallec — 2011
 La carte et le territoire, by Michel Houellebecq — 2011
 Tobie Lolness II - Les yeux d'Elisha, by Timothée de Fombelle — 2011
 Histoire d'Ali Baba & Histoire d'Aladdin des Mille et Une Nuits III, Traduction d'Antoine Galland — 2011
 Je suis le dernier Juif, by Chil Rajchman — 2011
 L'espèce humaine, by Robert Antelme, Am Oved — 2011
 Le village de l`allemand, by Boualem Sansal — 2010
 Le dernier frère, by Nathacha Appanah — 2010
 Totalité et infini, by Emmanuel Lévinas — 2010
 Lanzarote et autre textes, by Michel Houellebecq — 2010
 Tobie Lolness I, by Timothée de Fombelle — 2009
 Alabama Song, by Gilles Leroy — 2009
 Camille et Paul – La passion Claudel, by Dominique Bona — 2008
 Le Piège de Dante, by Arnaud Delalande — 2008
 J'étais derrière toi, by Nicolas Fargues — 2008
 Seras-tu là?, by Guillaume Musso — 2007
 Rester Vivant: Méthode, by Michel Houellebecq — 2007
 J'apprend L'allemand, by Denis Lachaud — 2007
 Impératrice, by Shan Sa — 2007
 De la passion, by Jacques André, Paul-Laurent Assoun, Jean Cournut, Julia Kristeva, Joyce McDougall, François Gautheret — 2007
 Farrago, by Yann Apperry — 2006
 Rosie Carpe, by Marie Ndiaye — 2006
 Moi, Bouddha, by José Frèches — 2006
 Liberté dialectique, by Izchak Klein — 2006
 Mohammed Cohen, by Claude Kayat — 2006
 Les Scénarios narcissiques de la parentalité, by J. Manzano, P. Espasa, and N. Zilkha — 2005

References 

Rama Ayalon at The Short Story Project website

1977 births
Living people
French–Hebrew translators
Israeli translators
People from Kfar Saba